The Irish Dunlop Tournament was a professional golf tournament played in Ireland until 1980. It was one of the top events on the professional circuit in Ireland.

Prior to World War II, it was a 72-hole stroke play event known as the Dunlop-Irish Tournament and was one of several regional tournaments sponsored by Dunlop in which the winners were sometimes invited to play in the Dunlop-Metropolitan Tournament. After the war Dunlop revived the tournament in 1946, switching to match play in 1947. After a break of two years, the Irish Dunlop returned as a 72-hole stroke play event in 1950, after which it was staged annually until its cancellation in 1981. It also provided a qualification route for the prestigious Dunlop Masters on the British PGA circuit.

In its final year, Des Smyth broke all records for the tournament as he finished 16 strokes ahead of the field with a 261 (27 under par) aggregate. He also set a new course record for Headfort Golf Club with a 64 in the final round, having already recorded 65 in both the first and third rounds.

Winners

See also
Dunlop-Metropolitan Tournament

References

Golf tournaments in Ireland
1933 establishments in Ireland
1980 disestablishments in Ireland
Recurring sporting events established in 1933
Recurring sporting events disestablished in 1980